The Montana Office of Public Instruction (OPI) is the state education agency of Montana. Elsie Arntzen currently serves as the Montana Superintendent of Public Instruction. The agency is headquartered in Helena.

The people of Montana have elected a Superintendent of Public Instruction as one of the five members of the executive branch since 1889. By law, the superintendent has general supervision of the K-12 public schools and school districts. The superintendent also serves as a member of the Land Board, the State Library Commission, and as an ex officio non-voting member of the Board of Public Education, the Board of Regents, and the Board of Education.

School data 2018-19

School graduation rates

Denise Juneau 2009-2017
Denise Juneau took office on January 5, 2009. In that same year tobacco use among Montana teens declined and student Student ACT scores were reporting up in 2009 from 2008. However, those two 2009 reported successes were attributed to the previous superintendent of Public Instruction, Linda McCulloch. In that same year math scores showed that Montana fourth and eighth–graders continued to test above the national average, and the number of students who struggle with reading was down from 2008.

In 2009, Montana's leadership in key Indian Education policies was recognized. Bozeman middle–school student Marina Dimitrov became America's Top Young Scientist. The National Indian Education Association named Denise Juneau 2009 Educator of the Year, and under Juneau's leadership Montana became one of only seven states receiving grants to increase the number of graduates.

At the end of 2009, Montana was awarded grants for schools to provide fresh fruits and vegetables to students. Juneau also promoted local agriculture through farm to school programs.

Montana Superintendents of Public Instruction

References

External links
 Montana Office of Public Instruction

 
State departments of education of the United States
State agencies of Montana
Public education in Montana